The Age for Love is a 1931 American pre-Code comedy film (now lost) directed by Frank Lloyd based on the 1930 novel of the same name by Ernest Pascal. The film was a vehicle for Howard Hughes' mistress Billie Dove. The film was a commercial failure, but this did not stop Hughes funding another film for Billie Dove.
The film's music includes "I'm Chuck Full of Kisses" (music by Alfred Newman, lyrics by screenwriter David Silverstein) and "Just Another Night" (again by Alfred Newman, Con Conrad and David Silverstein).

Cast
Billie Dove as Jean Hurd
Charles Starrett as Dudley Crome
Lois Wilson as Sylvia Pearson
Edward Everett Horton as Horace Keats
Mary Duncan as Nina Donnet
Adrian Morris as Jeff Aldrich
Betty Ross Clarke as Dot Aldrich
Vivien Oakland as Grace (*as Vivian Oakland)
George Beranger as The Poet (*as Andred Beranger)
Jed Prouty as Floyd Evans
Joan Standing as Eleanor
Alice Moe as Annie
Charles Sellon as Mr. Pearson
Pierre de Ramey as Jules (*as County Pierre de Ramey)
Cecil Cunningham as Pamela
Edna Heard as Singer

See also
List of lost films

References

External links
The Age for Love at IMDB

1931 films
1931 comedy-drama films
American comedy-drama films
Films based on American novels
Films directed by Frank Lloyd
Lost American films
American black-and-white films
1931 lost films
Lost comedy-drama films
1930s English-language films
1930s American films